The Devil's Footprints was a phenomenon that occurred during February 1855 around the Exe Estuary in East and South Devon, England. The footprints were so called because some persons suggested that they were the tracks of Satan and made comparisons to a cloven hoof. Many theories have been made to explain the incident, and some aspects of its veracity have also been questioned.

Incident 
On the night of 8–9 February 1855 and one or two later nights, after a heavy snowfall, a series of hoof-like marks appeared in the snow. Houses, rivers, haystacks and other obstacles were travelled straight over. The 26 May 1855 issue of Bell's Life in Sydney published in its Miscellaneous Extracts column a "Weekly Dispatch" dated 18 February:

"It appears on Thursday last night, there was a very heavy snowfall in the neighbourhood of Exeter and the South of Devon. On the following morning the inhabitants of the above towns were surprised at discovering the footmarks of some strange and mysterious animal endowed with the power of ubiquity, as the footprints were to be seen in all kinds of unaccountable places – on the tops of houses and narrow walls, in gardens and court-yards, enclosed by high walls and pailings, as well in open fields."

"The superstitious go so far as to believe that they are the marks of Satan himself; and that great excitement has been produced among all classes may be judged from the fact that the subject has been descanted on from the pulpit."

"The impressions of the foot closely resembled that of a donkey's shoe, and measured from an inch and a half to (in some instances) two and a half inches across. Here and there it appeared as if cloven, but in the generality of the steps the shoe was continuous, and, from the snow in the centre remaining entire, merely showing the outer crest of the foot, it must have been concave."

The area in which the prints appeared extended from Exmouth, up to Topsham, and across the Exe Estuary to Dawlish and Teignmouth. R.H. Busk, in an article published in Notes and Queries during 1890, stated that footprints also appeared further afield, as far south as Totnes and Torquay, and that there were other reports of the prints as far away as Weymouth (Dorset) and even Lincolnshire.

Evidence 
There is little direct evidence of the phenomenon. The only known documents were found after the publication during 1950 of an article in the Transactions of the Devonshire Association asking for further information about the event. This resulted in the discovery of a collection of papers belonging to Reverend H. T. Ellacombe, the vicar of Clyst St George during the 1850s. These papers included letters addressed to the vicar from his friends, among them the Reverend G. M. Musgrove, the vicar of Withycombe Raleigh, the draft of a letter to The Illustrated London News marked 'not for publication' and several apparent tracings of the footprints.

Mike Dash collated the available primary and secondary source material into a paper entitled The Devil's Hoofmarks: Source Material on the Great Devon Mystery of 1855 which was published in Fortean Studies during 1994.

Hypotheses 
Many explanations have been made for the incident. Some investigators are sceptical that the tracks really extended for more than a hundred miles, arguing that no-one would have been able to follow their entire course in a single day. Another reason for scepticism, as Joe Nickell indicates, is that the eye-witness descriptions of the footprints varied from person to person.

In his Fortean Studies article, Mike Dash concluded that there was no one source for the "hoofmarks": some of the tracks were probably hoaxes, some were made by "common quadrupeds" such as donkeys and ponies, and some by wood mice (see below). He admitted, though, that these cannot explain all the reported marks and "the mystery remains".

Balloon 
Author Geoffrey Household suggested that "an experimental balloon" released by mistake from Devonport Dockyard had left the mysterious tracks by trailing two shackles on the end of its mooring ropes. His source was a local man, Major Carter, whose grandfather had worked at Devonport at the time. Carter claimed that the incident had been hushed up because the balloon also wrecked a number of conservatories, greenhouses, and windows before finally descending to earth in Honiton.

While this could explain the shape of the prints, sceptics have questioned whether the balloon could have travelled such a random zigzag course without its trailing ropes and shackles becoming caught in a tree or similar obstruction.

Hopping mice 

Mike Dash suggested that at least some of the prints, including some of those found on rooftops, could have been made by hopping rodents such as wood mice. The print left behind after a mouse leaps resembles that of a Cloven-hoofed animal, due to the motions of its limbs when it jumps. Dash stated that the theory that the Devon prints were made by rodents was originally proposed as long ago as March 1855, in The Illustrated London News. In the paper's 10 March 1855 issue, Thomas Fox, a brewer and brick maker of Ballingdon, submitted illustrations of rodent tracks in varying snow depths as well as a diagram for how rodents' hind and forelimbs create the "hoof" shaped prints.

Kangaroo 
In a letter to the Illustrated London News during 1855, Rev. G. M. Musgrave wrote: "In the course of a few days a report was circulated that a couple of kangaroos escaped from a private menagerie (Mr Fische's, I believe) at Sidmouth." It seems, though, that nobody ascertained whether the kangaroos had escaped, nor how they could have crossed the Exe estuary, and Musgrave himself said that he invented the story to distract his parishioners' concerns about a visit from the devil:

Badgers 
In a letter to the editor of the Illustrated London News published 3 March 1855, Richard Owen stated the theory that the footprints were from a badger, arguing the animal was "the only plantigrade quadruped we have in this island" and it "leaves a footprint larger than would be supposed from its size". The number of footprints, he suggested, was indicative of the activity of several animals because "it is improbable that one badger only should have been awake and hungry" and added that the animal was "a stealthy prowler and most active and enduring in search of food".

Similar incidents 
Reports of similar anomalous, obstacle-unheeded footprints exist from other parts of the world, although none is of such a scale. This example was reported 15 years earlier in The Times:

In the Illustrated London News of 17 March 1855, a correspondent from Heidelberg wrote, "upon the authority of a Polish Doctor in Medicine", that on the Piaskowa-góra (Sand Hill), a small elevation on the border of Galicia, but in Congress Poland, such marks are to be seen in the snow every year, and sometimes in the sand of this hill, and "are attributed by the inhabitants to supernatural influences".

During 2013, trails were reported in Girvan, Scotland, possibly as part of an April Fool's hoax.

See also 
 Jersey Devil – the appearance during January 1909 of similar mysterious footprints in New Jersey, USA
 Phantom kangaroo
 The Great Thunderstorm – another legend of the Devil in Devon

References

Sources

External links and further reading
 Charles Fort, The Book of the Damned, Chapter 28.
 Mysterious Britain & Ireland
 
 

1855 in England
19th century in Devon
Devon folklore
February 1855 events
Forteana
Paranormal
Supernatural legends
Footprints